The Sedgwick County Courthouse, located at 315 Cedar St. in Julesburg, Colorado, was built during 1938-39 by the Works Progress Administration (WPA).  It was listed on the National Register of Historic Places in 2007; the listing included two contributing buildings.

It was deemed significant in social history for representing federal relief programs;  its construction provided "much needed assistance by giving jobs to the unemployed of the county during the Great Depression."

It also was deemed significant architecturally, as "an excellent example of the Art Deco style as applied to a government building whose construction was constrained by the economic conditions of the Depression."  It was designed by Jamieson and Stiffler, architects of Denver.

References

Courthouses on the National Register of Historic Places in Colorado
Government buildings completed in 1939
Buildings and structures in Sedgwick County, Colorado
County courthouses in Colorado
Works Progress Administration in Colorado
National Register of Historic Places in Sedgwick County, Colorado
1939 establishments in Colorado